Marcel Zelasco (16 August 1924 – 12 January 2002) was a French racing cyclist. He rode in the 1950 Tour de France.

References

1924 births
2002 deaths
French male cyclists